Frittole is an Italian fried doughnut type of food made from dough, typically with raisins, orange peels, or lemon peel in it. They are eaten in and around the Friuli-Venezia Giulia and Veneto regions. However, they originated around the Giuliani areas of Trieste and Venice. Many variations are common, including custard and chocolate fillings.  They are fried in oil until golden brown and sprinkled with sugar. They are included in the British Museum Cookbook by Michelle Berriedale-Johnson and a book about Venice from 1879. A Vendita Frittole is a fritter and liquor shop.

See also
 Frittelle
List of doughnut varieties
List of fried dough foods

References

External links
Photographs and cooking instructions
Photograph
Photograph

Italian pastries
Italian doughnuts